Velika Mlaka is a village in Croatia.

References

External links 

Populated places in Zagreb County
Velika Gorica